Don Rojas (born 1949) is a journalist and political commentator from Saint Vincent and the Grenadines. He was the Editor in Chief of Grenada's national newspaper The Free West Indian. He served as press secretary for Prime Minister Maurice Bishop from 1981 to 1983, until a Bishop power-sharing dispute led to fighting and Bishop's death. When U.S. Marines invaded Grenada in 1983, he was deported by the U.S. military to Barbados.

Rojas subsequently worked in the International Organization of Journalists (IOJ).

Rojas returned to the United States in the early 1990s.

Since moving to the United States, Rojas worked as General Manager of Pacifica Radio station WBAI in New York from late 2002 to May 2005. In the early 1990s, he was an editor at the New York Amsterdam News, a famous Black paper based in Harlem. In 2006 he was employed as a press officer by Oxfam America. In 2007, Rojas was employed by the Louisiana Disaster Recovery Foundation, an organization that awards money to nonprofit organizations assisting the state's residents in the aftermath of Hurricane Katrina.

He briefly served as Executive Director of Free Speech TV in 2014.

References

1949 births
Living people
Grenadian journalists